"People Are People" is a song by English electronic music band Depeche Mode, released on 12 March 1984 as the lead single from their fourth studio album, Some Great Reward (1984). Recorded at Hansa Mischraum in West Berlin, it was the band's first top-20 single in the United States, peaking at number 13 on the Billboard Hot 100.

Background
As with many Depeche Mode songs, the band members see different meanings in "People Are People". According to Martin Gore, the song is about racism. Alan Wilder adds that it could also be about war.

"People Are People" was written by Gore, but the dancy, pop feel of the song may be credited to Alan Wilder. Wilder wrote the B-side, "In Your Memory". Each song has an extended remix, the "Different Mix" and the "Slik Mix" respectively (although the "In Your Memory" mix is often incorrectly called the "Slick Mix" or "Silk Mix"). It was one of the first songs recorded for the album when sessions began at the Hansa Mischraum studio in January 1984.

"This was the first song of ours that made a dent, really, into popular radio", said Dave Gahan in 2017. "We were using all these tape loops to create rhythms and the technology was quite advanced, but it wasn't anything like it is today, the things that you can do. We used to go into studios, and the first thing we'd do, we'd ask where the kitchen was – literally for pots and pans and things that we could throw down the stairs, and record the rhythms they would make crashing around, and then make it into loops."

Despite the song's success, Gore considers it one of his least favourite songs. He prefers his songs to have subtle metaphors to allow people to find their own meanings to his songs, and feels "People Are People" does not fit that description. In 1990, he listed the song among some of the music he "regrets", calling "People Are People" "too nice, too commercial." It has not been played live since 1988. Though Gore has distastes to the song he also recognises that "without it, we might not have been around as a band right now."

Music Video 
The Clive Richardson-directed "People Are People" video was released in two versions. The original video was made for the single version, but an alternate video was made with the "Different Mix". The music video featured footage of various military scenes from the Cold War, mixed with footage of the band aboard HMS Belfast and of a record press. The "Different Mix" video appears on Some Great Videos and Video Singles Collection.

Album release
A compilation album titled People Are People was released in the United States, featuring several songs not previously available. The single itself was released in the US on 11 July 1984, though it did not reach the Billboard Hot 100 chart until May 1985, and was initially played only on modern rock and college radio. The single would eventually peak at number 13. In the UK, the single reached number four, which was at the time the band's highest singles chart position in their home country. Since then, "Barrel of a Gun" (1997) and "Precious" (2005) have also reached number four in the UK.

In West Germany, the song reached number one and was used as the theme to West German TV's coverage of the 1984 Summer Olympics, alluding to East Germany's participation in the Soviet-led boycott of the games. It was also used as the theme song of the 1990s BBC children's factual TV series It'll Never Work?.

In 2011, the song was included on the Rock and Roll Hall of Fame's list of the "500 Songs that Shaped Rock and Roll".

Track listings
7-inch single
A. "People Are People" – 3:43
B. "In Your Memory" – 4:01

12-inch single
A. "People Are People" (Different Mix) – 7:11
B. "In Your Memory" (Slik Mix) – 8:12

UK and German limited-edition 12-inch single
A. "People Are People" (On-USound Mix by Adrian Sherwood) – 7:30
B1. "People Are People" – 3:43
B2. "In Your Memory" – 4:01

US 12-inch single
A. "People Are People" (Different Mix) – 7:11
B1. "People Are People" (On-USound Mix) – 7:30
B2. "In Your Memory" – 4:01

"In Your Memory" is falsely labeled as the "Slik Mix Edit"

French and German CD single (1988)
 "People Are People" (Different Mix) – 7:11
 "In Your Memory" (Slik Mix) – 8:12
 "People Are People" (7″ Version) – 3:50

UK CD single (1991)
 "People Are People" – 3:43
 "In Your Memory" – 4:01
 "People Are People" (Different Mix) – 7:11
 "In Your Memory" (Slik Mix) – 8:12

Charts

Weekly charts

Year-end charts

Certifications

RuPaul version

American drag queen RuPaul covered "People Are People" in 2004 for his fourth studio album, Red Hot. His version, which features Tom Trujillo, was released as a retail single on 26 January 2006 to promote the remix album ReWorked. It peaked at number 10 on the Billboard Hot Dance Club Play chart.

Track listing
CD single
 "People Are People" (Craig C. Radio) – 4:42
 "People Are People" (Giuseppe D's Rutroactive Club) – 8:20
 "The Price of One" (Craig C. Ru Edit) – 6:43
 "People Are People" (Craig C. Main Vocal) – 8:01
 "The Price of One" (Craig C.'s Mo' Trippin' Dub) – 10:02
 "People Are People" (Goodandevil) – 3:42
 "People Are People" (DJ Record Player's SSSnakin' Breakin') – 7:11
 "The Price of One" (Craig C.'s Mo' Trippin' Beats) – 2:41
 "People Are People" (Craig C. Dub) – 8:01
 "I Just Can't Wait" (Till Christmas) – 2:42

Charts

See also
 List of number-one hits of 1984 (Germany)

References

External links
 "People Are People" information from the official Depeche Mode website
 AllMusic review

1984 songs
1984 singles
2006 singles
Depeche Mode songs
Mute Records singles
Number-one singles in Germany
RuPaul songs
Song recordings produced by Daniel Miller
Song recordings produced by Gareth Jones
Songs against racism and xenophobia
Songs written by Martin Gore
UK Independent Singles Chart number-one singles